The giant cheetah (Acinonyx pardinensis) is an extinct felid species that was closely related to the modern cheetah.

Description

The lifestyle and physical characteristics of the giant cheetah were probably similar to those of its modern relative, except the giant cheetah was the height of a lion at the shoulder (but, due to its light build, weighed considerably less). Like the modern cheetah, the giant cheetah was likely to have been a sprinter, but based on its proportions, was probably slower than the modern cheetah species.

Just as with the modern cheetah, almost every aspect of Acinonyx pardinesis was specialized for running, though not as fast. The muzzle is short and the nasal passage large for increased air intake during a strenuous sprint. To make room for the enlarged nasal passage, the maxilla was reduced and the anchorage for the canine roots was less, resulting in shorter canine roots and a shorter, more stout external canine, a characteristic seen in the modern cheetah. As evidenced by Marco Cherin, Denis Geraads et al, the giant cheetah may have also had a stronger bite than modern cheetahs, perhaps enough to crush bone. To lighten the weight of the animal, bone girth is reduced and the skeleton is lean and light, excellent for running, but probably not for fighting or coping with injuries, severe or minor. Its thoracic cavity was consumed by large lungs and a powerful heart. The intestines were probably shorter, to lighten the animal, and muscles not used for running were reduced. The diaphragm was likely connected to the movement of its gait and with the stretching phase of a stride, the expansion of space in the abdominal cavity pulled the diaphragm down and forced the animal to inhale, while the contractile phase compressed the lungs and forced air out, so it had no control over its breathing while running, a commonality of most quadruped sprinters. Analysis of its skeleton indicates that the giant cheetah was intermediate in morphology between the swift-moving cheetahs and slower big cats; for one, its head was more proportionate to that of the cheetah's cougar-like ancestors in appearance and its limbs were relatively more robust than the modern cheetah. Indeed, the giant cheetah may have less resembled its modern cousin and instead have had more in common in regards to morphology with the modern snow leopard, whose skeletal proportions are very similar. Despite its longer legs and potential as a sprinter, the giant cheetah was overall less suited to speed than its modern relatives due to its intermediate build and greater mass.

One of the most complete skulls of this species is from the French site of Saint-Vallier, but the best collection of postcranial bones came from the older site of Perrier in the Massif Central, including vertebral column and long bones of one individual were found. However, the metacarpals were not recovered, so subsequent reconstructions depict them at the same length as the modern Acinonyx.

Distribution and habitat
Giant cheetahs were present in Europe during the Early and Middle Pleistocene. The giant cheetah was found in Germany, France, and also in China and India. Giant cheetahs occurred alongside European jaguars and leopards at some Middle Pleistocene localities, and competition among the three possibly contributed to the cheetah's decline. Its large mass and more worn claws (when compared to modern cheetahs) suggest it was less adapted to climbing, an ability that would continue to evolve until modern-day cheetahs appeared.

Paleobiology

Within the same species, as shown in the modern South American jaguar (Panthera onca) and the Asian tiger (Panthera tigris), individuals in higher and colder areas grow to larger sizes. The fossil record for cheetahs is scarce. In contrast to Smilodon fatalis, severe injuries lead to death and there is no sign of cooperation as seen in the latter species of machairodont. Fossils suggest a lifestyle similar to the modern cheetah species: solitary, except for mothers and cubs and possibly siblings as seen with cheetah brothers, more specialized hunting tactics that narrow the number of species being hunted and therefore increasing the size of a territory and causing the species to be spread out more thinly than the much more adaptable modern leopard (Panthera pardus). Vertebrate paleontologist Alan Turner suggests, "since it had the bodily proportions of the living cheetah, and since running speed is a reflection of stride length for a given stride frequency, such large animals may also have been capable of running somewhat faster than their living relatives, although greater weight may have countered any advantage of greater size. Whether they needed to run faster is less clear." The reason for A. pardinensis achieving large size could be to keep warm, to move faster, to subdue larger prey, or a combination of the three.

On the same field as the modern cheetah, it would have been a relatively successful hunter, very wary of injuries, and rarely came into contact with others of its species. It would have been cautious, preferring fleeing to fighting, and would have been wary of large prey capable of injuring the cheetah. Cooperative hunting would generally have been unused, and mortality rates in the young would have been high.

Hunting

It could have preyed upon anything from small, contemporary muntjac deer and mountainous ibex, to elk and possibly sambar, prey that was considerably larger than the modern cheetah's ideal prey, the Thomson's gazelle. The modern cheetah uses a specific hunting style seen nowhere else in the cat family: on open plains, it locates prey and walks directly towards a group or individual, without crouching, with head and tail down. When it comes within suitable distance (usually 50 yards,) it sprints forward. The chase is fast and takes many turns until the cheetah uses an enlarged dew claw to hook the hind leg of the prey or smack its flanks to either knock it off balance or damage its Achilles tendon. When the prey falls to the ground, the cheetah suffocates it with a throat clamp, and after resting, eats as much as it can on the spot before being chased off by larger predators or occasionally having eaten all it can. This sequence of a chase over an open area and the hooking of the back leg is unique and often necessary for the cheetah: prey that does not flee is addressed with a great deal of confusion on the cheetah's part and is often left unharmed if it cannot be coaxed to flee. .

Due to the skeletal structure of Acinonyx pardinensis, the larger species very likely used a similar approach to hunting; it, too, bore a large dew claw and the lean form was definitely built for running. A stalk, sprint, trip, and kill was probably a commonality of the large species' hunting tactics. The modern cheetah almost always uses a throat clamp to suffocate prey and this species of Acinonyx likely used this method of killing. Due to the small canines and weaker jaw muscles of both species, a muzzle clamp (seen in lions) or severing of the spinal cord (seen in jaguars) is generally not an option, so a throat clamp would have been used most prominently. The giant cheetah, being more powerful and possessed of a stronger set of jaws as evidenced by Geraads et al., probably was also able to crush the bones in the neck and skull of its victims. As it was heavier too, it would likely have been a slower runner than modern cheetahs, despite its longer legs. The giant cheetah, like the modern cheetah, seemed to avoid eating bone based on the evidence of its carnassial teeth, and it was a fast eater that likely could consume a great deal of flesh before another predator, such as hyenas, the machairodont Homotherium, or wolves arrived to drive the cat from its kill.

See also
 American cheetah
 Big cat

References

Acinonyx
Mammals described in 1828
Prehistoric felines
Pleistocene mammals of Asia
Fossil taxa described in 1828